Campbellsburg is a town in Brown Township, Washington County, in the U.S. state of Indiana. The population was 585 at the 2010 census.

History
Campbellsburg was laid out in 1849, when it was certain that the railroad would be built through that territory. It was originally called Buena Vista in commemoration of the Battle of Buena Vista, but was later renamed Campbellsburg for Robert Campbell, who platted an addition to the town in 1851.

The Campbellsburg post office has been in operation since 1852.

Geography
Campbellsburg is located at  (38.652299, -86.261546).

Demographics

2010 census
As of the census of 2010, there were 585 people, 228 households, and 150 families living in the town. The racial makeup of the town was 98.5% White, 0.2% African American, 0.3% Asian, and 1.0% from two or more races. Hispanic or Latino of any race were 1.0% of the population.

There were 228 households, of which 37.7% had children under the age of 18 living with them, 43.0% were married couples living together, 18.9% had a female householder with no husband present, 3.9% had a male householder with no wife present, and 34.2% were non-families. 26.3% of all households were made up of individuals, and 9.6% had someone living alone who was 65 years of age or older. The average household size was 2.57 and the average family size was 3.12.

The median age in the town was 34.4 years. 30.1% of residents were under the age of 18; 8.7% were between the ages of 18 and 24; 23.4% were from 25 to 44; 25.7% were from 45 to 64; and 12.1% were 65 years of age or older. The gender makeup of the town was 49.1% male and 50.9% female.

2000 census
As of the census of 2000, there were 578 people, 232 households, and 141 families living in the town. The racial makeup of the town was 98.96% White, and 1.04% from two or more races. Hispanic or Latino of any race were 0.87% of the population.

There were 232 households, out of which 31.0% had children under the age of 18 living with them, 46.1% were married couples living together, 10.8% had a female householder with no husband present, and 38.8% were non-families. 32.3% of all households were made up of individuals, and 13.8% had someone living alone who was 65 years of age or older. The average household size was 2.49 and the average family size was 3.23.

In the town, the population was spread out, with 29.2% under the age of 18, 10.9% from 18 to 24, 26.1% from 25 to 44, 20.9% from 45 to 64, and 12.8% who were 65 years of age or older. The median age was 33 years. For every 100 females, there were 104.2 males. For every 100 females age 18 and over, there were 95.7 males.

The median income for a household in the town was $23,438, and the median income for a family was $38,750. Males had a median income of $25,375 versus $22,344 for females. The per capita income for the town was $13,672. About 14.7% of families and 15.3% of the population were below the poverty line, including 14.9% of those under age 18 and 13.6% of those age 65 or over.

References

Towns in Indiana
Towns in Washington County, Indiana
Louisville metropolitan area
Populated places established in 1849
1849 establishments in Indiana